Govt. College of Commerce, Abdullah Pur, Faisalabad ( گورنمنٹ کامرس کالج فیصل آباد ) is adjacent to Government Municipal Degree College, Faisalabad
Govt. College of Commerce, Abdullah Pur, Faisalabad is affiliated with University of the Punjab. It has separate section for Boys and Girls.

Degree Program
Associate Degree in Commerce
Masters in Commerce M.Com
BS Commerce
BS Economics
BBA (Bachelors of Business Administration)
BS Accounting and Finance
BS English
Other disciplines:
 I.Com
 ICS (Statistics and Economics)
 FA (IT)

See also
Government Municipal Degree College, Faisalabad
Government Degree College Jaranwala
Institute of Chartered Accountants of Pakistan

References

Public universities and colleges in Punjab, Pakistan
Education in Faisalabad
Universities and colleges in Faisalabad District